Computational journalism can be defined as the application of computation to the activities of journalism such as information gathering, organization, sensemaking, communication and dissemination of news information, while upholding values of journalism such as accuracy and verifiability. The field draws on technical aspects of computer science including artificial intelligence, content analysis (NLP, NLG, vision, audition), visualization, personalization and recommender systems as well as aspects of social computing and information science.

History of the field
The field emerged at Georgia Institute of Technology in 2006 where a course in the subject was taught by professor Irfan Essa. In February 2008 Georgia Tech hosted a Symposium on Computation and Journalism which convened several hundred computing researchers and journalists in Atlanta, GA. In July 2009, The Center for Advanced Study in the Behavioral Sciences (CASBS) at Stanford University hosted a workshop to push the field forward.

Since 2012, Columbia Journalism School has offered a course called Frontiers of Computational Journalism for the students enrolled in their dual degree in CS and journalism. The course covers many computer science topics from the perspective of journalism, including document vector space representation, algorithmic and social story selection (recommendation algorithms), language topic models, information visualization, knowledge representation and reasoning, social network analysis, quantitative and qualitative inference, and information security. 

Syracuse University launched a masters in computational journalism in 2015.

Stanford University launched a Computational Journalism Lab in 2015, as well as a course titled, Computational Journalism.

In 2017, the Associated Press published a guide for newsrooms to deploy artificial intelligence and computational methods.

Applications 
Over the years, computational journalism applications have involved different areas of the newsmaking process: from data gathering to the analysis of big data and their representation. In the beginning, therefore, it was more an aspect area linked to the discipline of data science, where the research and exploration of a fact may be automated.

But it is just with the rise of artificial intelligence that it has become possible to explore new types of applications, even up to the automation of news writing (text generation).

In this last field, there are interesting examples of application.

 The Washington Post that as early as 2017 declared to have published in a year 850 news written entirely by an artificial intelligence.
 The Guardian, with the proprietary artificial intelligence software called "ReporterMate", an experimental automated news reporting system.

Related fields
 Database journalism
 Computer-assisted reporting
 Data-driven journalism (extending the focus of data investigation to a workflow from data analysis to data visualization to storytelling based on the findings)

Resources
 Chapter on Computational Journalism in Handbook of Journalism Studies 2nd Ed.
 Columbia University Computational Journalism course
 Computational+Journalism courses at Georgia Tech
 A computational journalism reading list by Jonathan Stray of the Associated Press
 Communications of the ACM, October 2011, "Computational Journalism"
 How Artificial Intelligence Will Impact Journalism by Francesco Marconi of the Associated Press

References 

Types of journalism
Computational science
Computational fields of study